Gazette, Vol. 1 is the fourth studio album by American folk singer Pete Seeger. It was released in 1958 by Folkways Records, and later re-released by Smithsonian Folkways. The album artwork, credited on the album cover to Antonio Frasconi, is by Frasconi's wife Leona Pierce, and the design is by Ronald Clyne.

Selecting material mostly from the pages of Sing Out! magazine, Pete Seeger performs 20 "contemporary topical and political songs," as Folkways Records head Moses Asch puts it, with "contemporary" defined as the 25 years leading up to the album's 1958 release date. Annotator Irwin Silber, who was also editor of Sing Out!, calls the result a "living newspaper of history."

Track listing

References

1958 albums
Pete Seeger albums
Folkways Records albums